Mirko Giansanti (born 14 September 1976 in Terni) is an Italian former Grand Prix motorcycle road racer. His best year was in 1998 when he finished on the podium four times and finished in sixth place in the 125cc world championship. In 2008, Giansanti competed in the Supersport World Championship.

References 

1976 births
Living people
People from Terni
Italian motorcycle racers
125cc World Championship riders
250cc World Championship riders
Supersport World Championship riders
Sportspeople from the Province of Terni